Charles Horton Peck (March 30, 1833 – July 11, 1917) was an American mycologist of the 19th and early 20th centuries. He was the New York State Botanist from 1867 to 1915, a period in which he described over 2,700 species of North American fungi.

Biography 
Charles Horton Peck was born on March 30, 1833, in the northeastern part of the town Sand Lake, New York, now called Averill Park. After suffering a light stroke early in November 1912 and then a severe stroke in 1913, he died at his house in Menands, New York, on July 11, 1917.

In 1794, Eleazer Peck (his great grandfather) moved from Farmington, Conn. to Sand Lake, NY attracted by oak timber that was manufactured for the Albany market. Later on, Pamelia Horton Peck married Joel B., both from English descent, and became Charles Peck parents (Burnham 1919; Atkinson 1918). Even though his family was rich and locally prominent, his education was provincial (Haines 1986).

During his childhood, he used to enjoy fishing and hunting pigeons using a net with his grandfather and when he was old enough, the school days were limited to only winter season because he assisted in his father's sawmill. Dr. Peck went for the first time with his father to collect large cranberries when he was eight or ten years old. Picking up cranberries was a family matter since his grandmother went with the Indians, who knew the swamp very well, to perform this activity (Burnham 1919).

Education 
Dr. Peck went for the first time to Albany in 1841 and went back ten years later to attend the State Normal School. While studying there a young lady assisting a botany and natural history class in a city Jewish school changed and redirected his future career after the flowers she collected from the woods for her class fell by accident to Dr. Peck and that awakened his interest in that field. After that he volunteered to join Prof. J. H. Salisbury's botany class, as an extra study. In 1852 he graduated from the State Normal School and went back home to work in the hayfield but used his free time to collect and study plants, and during the winter of 1852 to 1853 he taught a large district school in Poestenkill and Rensselaer counties (Burnham 1919). Then, for three years he gave classes in Schram's Collegiate Institute of Sand Lake (Atkinson 1918).

Charles Peck took a preparatory course at Sand Lake College Institute and then started at Union College in the fall of 1855 to obtain his bachelor's degree of Arts in 1859, where he received an award of the Nott Prize Scholarship in honor for being one of the three students passing a special and extended examination. After graduating he went back to work at Sand Lake College Institute teaching classics, Mathematics, Botany, Greek, and Latin for three years. In 1862, Peck continued his studies at Union where he received his master's degree of Arts (Burnham 1919; Atkinson 1918; Haines 1986).

On June 10, 1908, at the 112th Commencement of Union College, Charles Peck obtains his PhD degree with a commemoration by Chairman Brownell: "By the direction of the Board of Trustees, I present for the degree of Doctor of Science, Charles Horton Peck of the Class of 1859. A graduate of this College, he has been for many years in public service as Botanist of the Empire State, Author, and Student of Nature and of Science. I request that the degree be conferred upon him". The President Alexander handed on the degree saying: "Charles Horton Peck. For faithful labors and high attainments in the realm of Science and for long and fruitful service, by the authority committed to me by the Trustees of Union College I confer upon you the degree of Doctor of Science and bid you enjoy all the rights, privileges and immunities pertaining thereto" (Burnham 1919).

Family 
Prior to the Civil War, on April 10 of 1861 Peck married Mary Catherine Sliter, daughter of Calvin and Anna Maria Sliter. They had two sons: the oldest named Harry Sliter that was born on 1863 and the youngest was Charles Albert, born on 1870. Dr. Peck's wife died on February 26 of 1912 (Burnham 1919; Haines 1986).

Professional life 
After turning down a job offer at Union for what he called "personal reasons", in 1863 Peck started to work in the classics department of the State Street High School, being known as "Cass's Academy" in Albany, New York. Because of this job he moved his family to Albany (Haines 1986; Both and Ortiz-Santana 2010).

While working at Albany, he became interested in moss after noticing it on a stick of wood. This interest led him to meet Professor Alphonse Wood in Brooklyn, who directed Peck into Sullivant's work on mosses and this is when Peck started his first collection on moss, spending hours on identifying specimens. Afterwards, he presented his collection to the State where it was seen by Judge Geo. W. Clinton, a descendant of one of New York's most powerful and leading families. Clinton was also a botanist that got very impressed and interested in Peck and his work on mosses. Because of his commitment to promote natural history education through the state natural history museum, he was instrumental in securing Peck's appointment in the State Cabinet of Natural History and became Peck's source of encouragement to be a productive public official for science (Burnham 1919).

Thanks to Clinton, in 1866 Dr. Peck was a volunteer in the State herbarium. The herbarium contained the important collection of New York plants put together by John Torrey during the nineteenth century, which involved only plants until Peck added fungi. He got hired part-time at the museum on January 1, 1867, to complement the herbarium with plants of the state and by 1868 Peck was hired full-time for $1,500 a year to build the cryptogrammic collections. Dr. Peck began his first mycological collection in the State Herbarium after Rev. Moses A. Curtis, of North Carolina, motivated him. This collection and study of it, is what gives Charles Peck a worldwide name for all time. In 1913, he presented his resignation letter as State Botanist but it is not until January 26, 1915, that it was accepted by the University of the State of New York. Dr. Peck retired from his job after forty-eight years of working at the State herbarium (Burnham 1919; Atkinson 1918).

Affiliations 
Dr. Peck contributed to a long series of annual reports of the State Botanist from 1867 to 1912. He belonged to part of the American Association for the Advancement of Science; he was a member of the Botanical Society of America; of the Albany Historical and Art Society; National Geographic Society; New England Botanical Club; American Forestry Association; and many mycological and scientific societies. Besides he was a loyal and noteworthy member of the Presbyterian Church for over sixty years (Burnham 1919).

Personal life 
Charles Peck did not expose much of his personality on his publications or letters, he was a private man. A man that loved fruits and vegetables, accustomed to physical training and therefore he was lean and fit. Peck's favorite outside work activities was climbing and walking the Adirondack and Catskill mountains. He avoided cursing, smoking tobacco, and drinking alcohol and was an early riser. In the politic area, he was a republican but he would vote for the best candidate no matter what group the candidate belonged to. His first vote was for John C. Fremont who won the elections against James Buchanan in 1856. In the religious area, he was Christian with strong religious convictions and believed in a simple and direct theory of the world being governed by one creator (Haines 1986).

Mycological legacy 
Charles Horton Peck contributed to the form and shape of American mycology, even though he was a botanist and never a student or professor in the mycology subject. He taught himself and reported his knowledge annually. He was not the first American mycologist, nor the first to publish a report in this field, but he was an important and central figure in America mycology because of his life and knowledge (Haines 1986).

After working forty-eight years, Peck left a legacy of 2700 new species identified of fungi, over 4000 pages of publications and about 36000 specimens. His major interest was Agaricaceae but he also described many species in other families. From 1869 to 1908 he reported an index of 2485 new species described and from 1909 to 1915 he described 249 more new species. Dr. Peck was an amazing general botanist whose work and publications covered fungi, mosses, ferns and seed plants. (Haines 1986; Gilbertson 1962(1); Gilbertson 1962(2)).

Species of mushroom he described  include:

Agaricus abruptibulbus
Agaricus abscondens
Agaricus abundans
Agaricus acericola
Agaricus adirondackensis
Agaricus admirabilis
Agaricus aggericola
Agaricus albissimus
Agaricus albocrenulatus
Agaricus alboflavidus
Agaricus albogriseus
Agaricus alboides
Agaricus alluviinus
Agaricus amabilipes
Agaricus amabillissimius
Agaricus silvicola
Agrocybe acericola
Agrocybe angusticeps
Agrocybe arenaria
Agrocybe edulis
Agrocybe firma
Agrocybe howeana
Agrocybe illicita
Agrocybe lenticeps
Agrocybe platysperma
Agrocybe pruinatipes
Agrocybe sororia
Agrocybe vermiflua
Amanita abrupta
Amanita bivolvata
Amanita brunnescens
Amanita calyptrata
Amanita calyptrata var. albescens
Amanita calyptratoides
Amanita candida
Amanita chlorinosma
Amanita crenulata'Amanita elongataAmanita frostiana var. frostianaAmanita frostiana var. pallidipesAmanita glabricepsAmanita magnivelarisAmanita morrisiiAmanita multisquamosaAmanita muscaria var. albaAmanita ocreataAmanita parcivolvataAmanita pellucidula (along with Banning)Amanita phalloides var. striatulaAmanita placomycesAmanita prairiicolaAmanita praticolaAmanita radicataAmanita spretaAmanita submaculataAmanita velosaAmanita volvataBoletus auriporusBoletus ornatipesBoletus vermiculosusClitocybe ectypoidesCortinarius corrugatusDrudeola sarraceniae (along with Clinton)Gymnopilus luteusHygrophorus sordidusHypomyces polyporinaInocybe mutataLactarius atroviridiLactarius deceptivusLactarius griseusLactarius rimosellusLeccinum rugosicepsLeucoagaricus americanusLeucoagaricus rubrotinctusMorchella angusticepsPeckia clintoniiPeckiella banningiaePeckiella camphoratiPeckiella hymeniiPeckiella hymenioidesPeckiella transformansPeckiella xylophilaPeckifungus entomophilusPsathyrella longipesRussula abietinaRussula aeruginascensRussula albellaRussula albidaRussula albidulaRussula anomalaRussula atropurpureaRussula balloniRussula ballouiRussula ballouiiRussula basifurcataRussula blackfordaeRussula brevipesRussula chamaeleontina var. umbonataRussula crustosaRussula earleiRussula eccentricaRussula flavicepsRussula foetentulaRussula granulataRussula luteobasisRussula magnificaRussula mariaeRussula modestaRussula nigrescentipesRussula nigrodiscaRussula ochrophyllaRussula palustrisRussula pectinatoidesRussula polyphyllaRussula pulverulentaRussula pusillaRussula rubrotinctaRussula rugulosaRussula serissimaRussula simillimaRussula sordidaRussula squalidaRussula subdepallensRussula subsordidaRussula subvelutinaRussula uncialisRussula unicalisRussula ventricosipesRussula viridellaRussula viridipes (along with Banning)Suillus punctipesTaxon named after Peck

He was honoured in 1878 when botanist George Perkins Clinton named a genus of fungi Peckia , Peck then named the type species Peckia clintonii .

Then in 1883, botanist Pier Andrea Saccardo circumscribed Neopeckia, which is a genus of fungi in the class Dothideomycetes. Saccardo also published Peckiella (Sacc.) Sacc. 1891 which are now classed as synonyms in the Hypocreaceae genus. (such as Hypomyces camphorati)

In 1891, Kuntze published the fungi genus Peckifungus , then Peck published Peckifungus entomophilus  in 1891. This is now a synonym for Appendiculina entomophila  (in the Laboulbeniaceae family).
 
Lastly, in 1978, mycologist Margaret Elizabeth Barr-Bigelow published Chapeckia, which is a genus of fungi in the family Sydowiellaceae.

References

Other sources
 Atkinson, G. F. Charles Horton Peck. University of Chicago Press. Chicago Journal. Botanical Gasette, Vol. 65, Np. 1. 1918; pp 103–108.
 Both, E. E.; and Ortiz-Santana, B. Clinton, Peck and Frost – The dawn of North American boletology. Bulletin of the Buffalo Society of Natural Science, Vol 39. 2010; pp 11–28.
 Burnham, S. H. Charles Horton Peck. Mycological Society of America. Mycologia, Vol. 11, No. 1. 1919; pp 33–39.
 Gilbertson, R. L. Index to species and varieties of fungi described by C. H. Peck from 1909 to 1915. Mycological Society of America. Mycologia, Vol. 54, No. 5 (Sep–Oct) 1962; pp. 460–465. 
 Gilbertson, R. L. Resupinate Hydnaceous Fungi of North America. I. Type studies of species described by Peck. Mycological Society of America. Mycologia,'' Vol. 54, No. 6 (Nov–Dec) 1962; pp. 658–677. 
 Haines, J. H. Charles Peck and his contributions to American Myology. Mycotaxon. Vol. XXVI. (Jul–Sep). 1986; pp 17–27.

1833 births
1917 deaths
American mycologists
Union College (New York) alumni
People from Sand Lake, New York
Scientists from New York (state)